Portrait of Martin Luther is a 1564 oil on canvas painting by Lucas Cranach the Younger and studio, in St. Elizabeth's Church, Wrocław before World War Two and now in the National Museum, Warsaw. It is based on Lucas Cranach the Elder's three-quarter length 1539 portrait of Martin Luther.

The subject holds a black-bound Bible and is dressed in everyday clothes and without unnecessary decoration, fitting the conventions of bourgeois portraiture of the time. In the top right hand corner is the Cranach coat of arms (a winger snake with a ring in its mouth) and the date 1564. At the bottom is a Latin inscription:

Diptychs
The work is a pendant to a portrait of Philip Melanchthon, also now in the National Museum, Warsaw. Such a diptych was a popular product of the Cranach studio, commissioned to decorate private homes or churches.

References

External links
 Cranach Digital Archive – Portrait of Martin Luther

1564 paintings
Cultural depictions of Martin Luther
Paintings in the collection of the National Museum, Warsaw
Paintings by Lucas Cranach the Younger